John Peel Sessions is an album by The Moondogs, released in 2003.

Track listing
"Schoolgirl Crush"  – 2:51       
"Who's Gonna Tell Mary"  – 3:07       
"Talking in the Canteen"  – 3:37       
"Roddy's Gang"  – 2:50       
"Dream Girl"  – 2:24       
"Home Is Where the Heart Is"  – 4:43       
"That's What Friends Are For"  – 3:48       
"I'm Not Sleeping"  – 3:34

Personnel
Gerry McCandless - guitar, vocals
John Peel - liner notes
Mike Robinson -  producer
Tony Wilson - producer
David Dade - engineer
James Bartlett - liner notes
The Moondogs - main performer
Austin Barrett - drums
Jackie Hamilton - bass guitar, vocals

The Moondogs albums
Moondogs
2003 live albums